William Alexander Grant (June 16, 1882 – April 16, 1942) was a Canadian curler. He was the lead of the 1928 and 1929 Brier Champion teams (skipped by Gordon Hudson), representing Manitoba. Grant was a 1975 inductee to the Canadian Curling Hall of Fame. He died suddenly in 1942 while attending a curling meeting at  the Fort Rouge Curling Club.

Grant was married twice and had two children with his second wife Doris, Thomas Alexander Grant (1928-2002) and Barbara Longworth nee:Grant (1931-2020).

References

Brier champions
1882 births
1942 deaths
Curlers from Winnipeg
People from Ingersoll, Ontario
Canadian male curlers